Nora Gubisch (born Paris, 1971) is a French operatic mezzo-soprano. She is married to the pianist and conductor Alain Altinoglu.

Discography 
Jules Massenet : "Thérèse". Altinoglu, Castronovo, Dupuis 
 Maurice Ravel : Mélodies. Piano : Alain Altinoglu (Naîve)
 Henri Duparc : Mélodies. Piano : Alain Altinoglu (Cascavelle)
 Michael Tippett : A Child of Our Time. Staatskapelle Dresden, Sir Colin Davis
 Pascal Dusapin : Perelà. Orchestre national de Montpellier. Graham-Hall, Perraud, Juipen, direction : Alain Altinoglu (Naïve)
 Jacques Offenbach : Die Rheinnixen. Beczala, Jenis, Orchestre National de Montpellier. direction : Friedemann Layer (Accord Universal)
 Kodály : Háry János. Gérard Depardieu, Layer (Accord Universal)
 Humperdinck : Königskinder : Jonas Kaufmann, Roth, Sala, Armin Jordan (Accord Universal)
 Thierry Escaich : Les Nuits hallucinées : Orchestre National de Lyon, Jun Märkl (Accord Universal)
 Nora Gubisch - Folk Songs. Falla: Siete canciones populares españolas. Obradors: Aquel sombrero de monte el vito. Enrique Granados: La Maja dolorosa; El mirar de la Maja. El tra la la y el punteado. Berio: Folk song. Brahms: 2 Gesänge für eine Altstimme mit Bratsche und Pianoforte op. 91; Wiegenlied op. 49 Nr. 4. Nora Gubisch, Alain Altinoglu Naive, 2013

References

French operatic mezzo-sopranos
1971 births
Living people
Singers from Paris
Chevaliers of the Ordre des Arts et des Lettres
21st-century French singers
21st-century French women singers